Qua may refer to:

 Alfonso Qua, sailor from Philippines
 Castle Qua, in Scotland
 Lam Qua (1801–1860), Chinese painter
 Qua (album), a 2009 album by German band Cluster
 Quapaw language, a Siouan language with ISO 639-3 code qua

See also 

 Qua v John Ford Morrison Solicitors, a UK labour law case
 Lord Quas (musician)
 Quas (gamer)
 quas primas
 QwaQwa
 Kua
 Quah (disambiguation)
 Kwa (disambiguation)
 Cwa (disambiguation)
 Qa (disambiguation)